The Atomium is a landmark modernist building in Brussels, Belgium, originally constructed as the centrepiece of the 1958 Brussels World's Fair (Expo '58). Designed by the engineer André Waterkeyn and the architects André and Jean Polak as a tribute to scientific progress, as well as to symbolise Belgian engineering skills at the time, it is located on the Heysel/Heizel Plateau in Laeken (northern part of the City of Brussels), where the exhibition took place. Nowadays, it is the city's most popular tourist attraction, and serves as a museum, an art centre and a cultural destination.

Its nine  stainless steel clad spheres are connected in the shape of a unit cell that could represent an iron crystal magnified 165 billion times. Steel tubes connecting the spheres enclose stairs, escalators and an elevator (in the central, vertical tube) to allow access to the six visitable spheres, which contain exhibit halls and other public spaces. The top sphere includes a restaurant with a panoramic view of Brussels. The building was completely renovated between 2004 and 2006 by the companies Jacques Delens and BESIX.

The building is located on the /, at the intersection of the / with the / and the /, and opposite the Centenary Palace of the Brussels Exhibition Centre (Brussels Expo). It is served by Heysel/Heizel metro station on line 6 of the Brussels Metro.

Naming
The name Atomium (pronounced  ) is a portmanteau combining the words atom and aluminium, the metal with which the spheres were initially covered. The Brussels-Capital Region is bilingual; hence, both the monument's French and Dutch names— and —are official. In French,  (pronounced ) is used both in the masculine and in the feminine, even if the monument's official team prefers the feminine. In Dutch, the question does not arise since  (pronounced ) is neuter. In English, it is usually referred to with the definite article 'the' in front: the Atomium.

History

Inception and construction
The Atomium was built as the main pavilion and icon of the 1958 Brussels World's Fair (Expo '58). In the 1950s, faith in scientific progress was great, and a structure depicting atoms was chosen to highlight humanity's advance in science, including nuclear physics, which Belgium itself was an avid practitioner ever since the Belgian Congo's uranium became the dominant source of material used for nuclear fission, including that used for the world's first nuclear weapons. With the Atomium, Belgium wanted to highlight and promote the post-war ideal to peacefully apply atomic research and other advancements in technology in order to improve lives and serve the betterment of mankind. The Atomium's nine  stainless steel clad spheres depict nine iron atoms in the shape of the body-centred cubic unit cell that could for example represent α-iron (ferrite) crystal, magnified 165 billion times.

The construction of the Atomium was a technical feat. The architects André and Jean Polak were responsible for the architectural transposition of the concept, drawing up numerous sketches to do so. The company received assistance from consulting engineers Artémy S. Joukoff and André Beckers, assisted by the design office V. Daniel. The foundations were launched in March 1956 and the building, erected by the Jambes-Namur Construction Workshops, was completed less than a month before the inauguration of Expo '58, on 17 April 1958.

Expo '58 and posterity
Since opening, only six of the nine spheres are accessible to the public, the three of the central axis and the three lower ones, each with two main floors and a lower floor reserved for service. Tubes of  diameter connect the spheres along the twelve edges of the cube and all eight vertices to the centre. It allows 22 people to reach the summit in 23 seconds. The escalators installed in the oblique tubes are also among the longest in Europe.

Three of the four top spheres lack vertical support and hence are not open to the public for safety reasons (to minimise foot traffic in the sphere). The original design called for no leg supports on the three lower outer spheres; the structure was simply to rest on the singular mid-bottom sphere. However, wind tunnel tests proved that such a structure would have toppled in an  wind, whilst up to  winds have been recorded in Belgium. Support columns were thus added under the three spheres in question to achieve enough resistance against overturning.

The Atomium, designed to last six months, was not destined to survive the 1958 World's Fair, but its popularity and success made it a major element of Brussels' landscape. Its destruction was therefore postponed year after year, until the city's authorities decided to keep it. However, for thirty years, little maintenance work was done. Still, the building continued serving as the backdrop for major events and competitions. In 1960, the 47th Tour de France passed in front of it on its inaugural stages. From 1960 to 1962, the Brussels Motor Grand Prix automobile race was organised not far from it.

Renovation (2004–2006)
By the turn of the millennium, the state of the building had deteriorated and a comprehensive renovation was sorely needed. Renovation of the Atomium, carried by Belgian construction companies Jacques Delens and BESIX, began in March 2004; it was closed to the public in October of that year, and remained closed until 18 February 2006. The renovation included replacing the faded aluminium sheets on the spheres with stainless steel, as well as building a new reception pavilion with a boomerang-shaped roof. At the foot of the building, the roundabout was redeveloped into a concrete esplanade lined with continuous benches and a large step leading to the north-east.

On 21 December 2005, the Atomium's new outdoor lighting was tested. The meridians of each sphere were covered with rectangular steel plates, in which LED lighting was integrated. The LED application illuminates the bulbs at night. The lights can also flash simultaneously or in turns at each meridian, symbolising the range of an electron around its core. In addition, the German industrial designer Ingo Maure created lighting objects and installations for the interior of the building.

On 14 February 2006, the Atomium was officially reopened by then-Prince Philippe, and on 18 February 2006, it opened again to the public. The renovation cost €26 million. Brussels and the Atomium Association paid one-third of the costs, and the Belgian Government financed the other two thirds. To help finance the renovation, pieces of the old aluminium plates were sold to the public as souvenirs. In March 2006, a 2 euro commemorative coin depicting the building was issued to celebrate the renovation and reopening.

Though the Atomium depicts an iron unit cell, the spheres were originally clad with aluminium. Following the 2004–2006 renovation, however, the aluminium was replaced with stainless steel, which is primarily iron. Likewise, while the subject of Atomium was chosen to depict the enthusiasm of the Atomic Age, iron is not and cannot be used as fuel in nuclear reactions.

Usage
The Atomium, with over 600,000 visitors per year, is now the most popular tourist attraction in the capital of Europe, an art centre and an international symbol of Brussels and Belgium. In addition to its heritage value, it is also a cultural place. Over half of the building is dedicated to exhibitions with themes about Belgium and digital arts.

Of the six spheres accessible to the public:
 the bottom sphere is reserved for permanent exhibitions dedicated to the 1950s, Expo '58 and the building's construction;
 the second sphere hosts temporary exhibitions;
 the third and central spheres have a versatile vocation and allow the organisation of various events, films, concerts, parties or conferences;
 the top sphere, in addition to the panorama, holds a restaurant;
 the sixth sphere is the kids' sphere, intended for the organisation of workshops of urban pedagogy, allowing children from six to twelve years to spend the night there.

Worldwide copyright claims

SABAM, Belgium's society for collecting copyrights, has claimed worldwide intellectual property rights on all reproductions of the image via the United States Artists Rights Society (ARS). For example, SABAM issued a demand that a United States website remove all images of the Atomium from its pages. The website responded by replacing all such images with a warning not to take photographs of the Atomium, and that A.S.B.L. Atomium will sue any individual or group if they show the photographs to anyone. SABAM confirmed that permission is required.

Ralf Ziegermann remarked on the complicated copyright instructions on the Atomium's website specific to "private pictures". The organisers of Belgian heritage, Anno Expo (planning the 50th anniversary celebrations of Expo 58), in the city of Mechelen announced a "cultural guerrilla strike" by asking people to send in their old photographs of the Atomium and requested 100 photoshoppers to paint over the balls. SABAM responded that they would make an exception for 2008 and that people could publish private photographs for one year only on condition they were for non-commercial purposes. Anno Expo later announced they had censored part of their own report due to "complications" and referred to a meeting they had with SABAM. Mechelen's Mayor, Bart Somers, called the Atomium copyright rules absurd.

From the Atomium's website, the current copyright restrictions exempt private individuals under the following conditions:

In the summer of 2015, Belgian political party Open Vld, proposed a bill to enable freedom of panorama in Belgium. The bill was enacted into law in June 2016, allowing pictures of the Atomium, and other public buildings under copyright, to be legally distributed.

Gallery

See also
 List of tallest structures in Belgium
 Design Museum Brussels
 History of Brussels
 Culture of Belgium

References

Notes

Bibliography

External links

Atomium renovation and interior design by Conix Architects 

Webcam Atomium
Atomium: virtual visit
Atomium's architecture

Buildings and structures completed in 1958
Buildings and structures in Brussels
Tourist attractions in Brussels
Expo 58
World's fair architecture in Belgium
Copyright infringement